Li Zicheng may refer to:
 Li Zicheng, Chinese rebel leader who overthrew the Ming dynasty in 1644
 Li Zicheng (athlete), a Chinese athlete
 Li Zicheng (politician), a Chinese politician serving as the deputy mayor of Huaihua, Hunan